Enoch "Nuck" Brown, Jr. (May 19, 1892 – 1962) was an All-Southern  college football end for the Vanderbilt Commodores of Vanderbilt University.

Early years
Enoch Brown, Jr. was born on May 19, 1892 in Franklin, Tennessee to Enoch Brown, Sr. and Lucinda Allen. His older brother Innis Brown was captain of the 1905 Vanderbilt Commodores football team and a long time official. Enoch, Jr. attended preparatory school at Battle Ground Academy.

Vanderbilt
Brown also was a catcher on the Vanderbilt baseball team and a member of the basketball team. Nuck was captain of the 1913 Vanderbilt Commodores football team.  He was also a Rhodes Scholar. At Vanderbilt he was a member of Delta Tau Delta.

Brown won the Bachelor of Ugliness for the class of 1914.

Coaching career

High school
Nuck Brown later coached at Montgomery Bell Academy.

Vanderbilt
Brown assisted his alma mater in 1920.

References

1892 births
1962 deaths
Vanderbilt Commodores football players
Vanderbilt Commodores baseball players
Vanderbilt Commodores men's basketball players
All-Southern college football players
American football ends
American Rhodes Scholars
Baseball catchers
People from Franklin, Tennessee
Players of American football from Tennessee
High school football coaches in Tennessee
American men's basketball players